The 2015 PBZ Zagreb Indoors was an ATP tennis tournament played on hard courts indoors. It was the 10th edition of the PBZ Zagreb Indoors, and part of the ATP World Tour 250 series of the 2015 ATP World Tour. It took place in Zagreb, Croatia from February 2 through February 8, 2015.

Points and prize money

Point distribution

Prize money 

* per team

Singles main-draw entrants

Seeds 

 Rankings are as of January 19, 2015.

Other entrants 
The following players received wildcards into the singles main draw:
  Toni Androić
  Mate Delić
  Antonio Veić

The following players received entry from the qualifying draw:
  Matthias Bachinger
  Michael Berrer
  Frank Dancevic
  Illya Marchenko

Withdrawals 
Before the tournament
  Simone Bolelli → replaced by  Damir Džumhur
  Marin Čilić → replaced by  Jürgen Melzer
  Vasek Pospisil → replaced by  Blaž Kavčič
  Jiří Veselý → replaced by  James Ward

Doubles main-draw entrants

Seeds 

 Rankings are as of January 19, 2015.

Other entrants 
The following pairs received wildcards into the doubles main draw:
  Mate Delić /  Nikola Mektić
  Dino Marcan /  Antonio Šančić

Champions

Singles 

  Guillermo García López def.  Andreas Seppi, 7–6(7–4), 6–3

Doubles 

  Marin Draganja /  Henri Kontinen def.  Fabrice Martin /  Purav Raja, 6–4, 6–4

References

External links 
 

Zagreb Indoors
PBZ Zagreb Indoors
2015 in Croatian tennis